Three Arch Bay is a  private gated community located at the southern end of Laguna Beach, California. The community features some oceanfront homes with swimming pools built into the intertidal rocks which are replenished by the incoming tides.

While its beach is inaccessible except through the private community, it is not truly private. There are no actual private beaches in mainland California. The California Constitution provides that all beaches seaward of the mean high tide line (the damp or wet sand) are public property, and that the public has a fundamental right to access.

History
According to a letter of Dana Point developer Sidney Woodruff, the entire  site was purchased in 1926 for $135,000.

The first rock pool was created in 1929 by film producer Edward H. Griffith. Griffith built his property, which included a lighthouse, for use as a backdrop in feature films. Early movies filmed in Three Arch Bay included Warner Bros.' Captain Blood (1935) starring Errol Flynn and Olivia de Havilland,  and Paramount Pictures' Give Us This Night (1936).

By 1939 lots in the area were sold for $100 down on a $3000 lot. The original sales promotional advertisements warned of "Rattlesnakes Galore."

References

Populated coastal places in California
Gated communities in California